Lathan's Gold is an adventure module published in 1984 for the Dungeons & Dragons fantasy role-playing game.

Plot summary
Lathan's Gold is a solo adventure scenario in which the single player character searches islands on the Sea of Dread for money to pay ransom to a kidnapper.

Publication history
XSOLO Lathan's Gold was written by Merle M. Rassmussen, with illustrations by Jeff Easley, and was published by TSR in 1984 as a 32-page booklet with an outer folder.

Reception

Reviews

References

Dungeons & Dragons modules
Mystara
Role-playing game supplements introduced in 1984